Lieutenant General Sir Hugh Jamieson Elles  (27 May 1880 – 11 July 1945) was a British officer and the first commander of the newly formed Tank Corps during the First World War.

Early life
Born in British India on 27 May 1880, Hugh Jamieson Elles was the younger son of Sir Edmond Alles. Returning to England, he was educated at Clifton College, and the Royal Military Academy, Woolwich, after which he was commissioned as a second lieutenant into the Royal Engineers in June 1899. He served in South Africa during the latter part of the Second Boer War and then undertook regimental duty in Aldershot. In 1913 he attended the Staff College, Camberley.

World War I

On the outbreak of World War I in August 1914, he was posted to the staff of the 4th Division and departed for France soon afterwards. He served at Le Cateau, then took part in the Retreat to the Seine and the battle of the Aisne, where the German Army was halted. He then moved north with the British Expeditionary Force (BEF) to Flanders, taking part in the Battle of Armentières in October 1914. In February 1915, he was promoted to brevet major and served as the brigade major of the 10th Brigade. He was wounded during the brigades' counterattack, on 25 April 1915, during the Second Battle of Ypres.

In August 1915, after recovering from his injuries, Elles was one of three officers specially selected by General Sir William Robertson, soon to be Chief of the Imperial General Staff (CIGS), the professional head of the British Army, to liaise with troops at the front and pass the information directly to the British General Headquarters (GHQ). In January 1916, as a General Staff Officer (GSO), Elles was sent by General Sir Douglas Haig, the Commander-in-Chief (C-in-C) of the BEF on the Western Front, to investigate the first tanks or "caterpillars" being built in England. He attended the first trials of "Mother" and reported back to Haig on its success. During the summer of 1916, Elles, who in June had been awarded the Distinguished Service Order (DSO), was tasked to report back from the Somme, where the tanks were first used. Promoted to the temporary rank of colonel, Elles was appointed to head the Heavy Branch (the first tank units) of the Machine Gun Corps in France on 29 September 1916.

Having seen the tanks achieve little success during the Battle of Passchendaele because of the exceptionally wet ground conditions of the autumn 1917, he pressed Haig to use massed tanks on the drier, open ground at Cambrai. On 20 November 1917 he personally led 350 tanks into battle at Cambrai in a Mark IV tank called Hilda, named after a favourite aunt. Elles continued to command the Tank Corps until Germany's surrender in November 1918.

For his services during the war he was awarded the Army Distinguished Service Medal by the Government of the United States. The citation for the medal reads:

Later career
After the war, he commanded the Tank Corps Training Centre from 1919 to 1923 and was Inspector of Tank Corps at the War Office. He then commanded the 9th Infantry Brigade being posted to HQ Eastern Command as Chief of Staff in August 1926. In 1930 he was appointed Director of Military Training at the War Office and then, in 1933, became General Officer Commanding (GOC) of the 42nd (East Lancashire) Infantry Division, a Territorial Army formation, for a few months. In April 1934, he was appointed Master-General of the Ordnance in the rank of lieutenant general; he was also the head of the Mechanisation Branch for which his previous service made him particularly suitable. He retired in 1938 and was Civil Defence Commissioner for South West England during the Second World War.

Elles was married three times, his first two wives dying before him. He died in London on 11 July 1945.

References

 

|-
 

1880 births
1945 deaths
British Army lieutenant generals
People educated at Clifton College
Graduates of the Royal Military Academy, Woolwich
Royal Engineers officers
British Army personnel of the Second Boer War
British Army generals of World War I
British Army generals of World War II

Knights Commander of the Royal Victorian Order
Knights Commander of the Order of St Michael and St George
Knights Commander of the Order of the Bath
Commanders of the Order of the Crown (Belgium)
Recipients of the Croix de guerre (Belgium)
Companions of the Distinguished Service Order
Recipients of the Order of the Rising Sun, 2nd class
Commandeurs of the Légion d'honneur
Graduates of the Staff College, Camberley
Military personnel of British India